"Swamp" is a 1987 single by That Petrol Emotion.

Track listing 7"

Track listing 12"

Personnel 
 Steve Mack: Vocals
 John O'Néill: Guitar
 Raymond O'Gorman: Guitar
 Damian O`Néill: Bass Guitar
 Ciaran McLaughlin: Drums

References

1987 songs
That Petrol Emotion songs
Polydor Records singles
Songs written by John O'Neill (guitarist)